Statue of Alexander Hamilton may refer to:

 Statue of Alexander Hamilton (Boston)
 Statue of Alexander Hamilton (Central Park)
 Statue of Alexander Hamilton (Chicago)
 Statue of Alexander Hamilton (Columbia University)
 Statue of Alexander Hamilton (U.S. Capitol)
 Statue of Alexander Hamilton (Washington, D.C.)